Loccum is a village situated about 50 km north west of Hanover in the district of Nienburg in Lower-Saxony, Germany. It has been a part of the city of Rehburg-Loccum since 1974. Loccum covers an area of 32 km² with a population of about 3166 people (2003).

 Loccum Abbey was founded in 1163 by Cistercian monks from Volkenroda Abbey in Thuringia. It is one of the best preserved buildings of its kind in Germany. It became a Lutheran monastery around 1600.

In Loccum there is a Protestant academy for prospective ministers.

External links
  Loccum Abbey
  Rehburg-Loccum

Villages in Lower Saxony
Rehburg-Loccum